Eric James Rush (born 11 February 1965 in Kaeo) is a New Zealand former rugby union footballer and rugby sevens legend, and now a supermarket owner. His New Zealand Sevens career began in 1988 and ran until past his 39th birthday in 2004. Rush played in more than 60 tournaments, with the highlights being two Commonwealth Games gold medals and the World Cup Sevens victory in 2001. He was also voted Best and Fairest Player at the 1991 Hong Kong Sevens.

He was regarded as a pacy and skillful winger and also played for the All Blacks briefly until the emergence of Jonah Lomu effectively ended his All Blacks career. Lomu played a major role in the 2001 World Cup Sevens win, effectively filling in for Rush, who suffered a broken leg in New Zealand's last group match of that tournament.

Career
Rush switched full-time to rugby sevens in 1999 to compete in the newly formed IRB international Sevens circuit. Rush helped New Zealand to win the first six editions of the World Sevens Series.

Over the course of 14 years, Rush regularly appeared for the New Zealand Sevens team at the Hong Kong Sevens and other sevens tournaments, mostly as captain. In later years, he was converted into a forward in the sevens version, with the wing position given to his understudy Karl Te Nana.

In 15's rugby, Rush played first for Auckland Rugby Union then moved North to play for North Harbour at NPC level, where he blossomed.

Retirement
On retiring from playing in 2005 he became assistant to New Zealand Sevens coach Gordon Tietjens.

In 2010 Rush became owner operator of the Browns Bay franchise of the New World Supermarket chain and in February 2014 took over the New World store in Kaikohe. On 17 September 2017 Rush took over ownership of New World, Regent in Whangarei.

In 2020, he completed season 1 of Match Fit, and revealed he had hip and knee replacements. Despite that, his metabolic age was 40 as a 58-year-old, the oldest member of the playing squad, and was by far the fittest player in the team. However, he had been sidelined with heel spur since week 2.

All Blacks Statistics 
Tests: 9 (0 as Captain)
Games: 20 (0 as Captain)
Total Matches: 29 (0 as Captain)
Test Points: 25pts (5t, 0c, 0p, 0dg, 0m)
Game Points: 65pts (13t, 0c, 0p, 0dg, 0m)
Total Points: 90pts (18t, 0c, 0p, 0dg, 0m)

References

External links 
 
 

1965 births
Living people
New Zealand rugby union players
Rugby union wings
North Harbour rugby union players
New Zealand international rugby union players
Commonwealth Games gold medallists for New Zealand
Māori All Blacks players
Rugby sevens players at the 1998 Commonwealth Games
Rugby sevens players at the 2002 Commonwealth Games
Commonwealth Games rugby sevens players of New Zealand
People educated at Tangaroa College
New Zealand international rugby sevens players
New Zealand male rugby sevens players
Commonwealth Games medallists in rugby sevens
People from the Northland Region
Medallists at the 1998 Commonwealth Games
Medallists at the 2002 Commonwealth Games